Animatronic is the third studio album by Norwegian metal band The Kovenant, released in 1999 through Nuclear Blast.

Track listing

Personnel
Lex Icon – vocals, bass
Psy Coma – guitars, keyboards, programming
Von Blomberg - drums

Additional personnel
Eileen Küpper - vocals (soprano)
Matthias Klinkmann - engineering
Siggy Bemm - producer
Per Heimly - photography

References

1999 albums
The Kovenant albums
Nuclear Blast albums